Lanicemine (AZD6765) is a low-trapping NMDA receptor antagonist that was under development by AstraZeneca for the management of severe and treatment-resistant depression.   Lanicemine differs from ketamine in that it is a low-trapping NMDA receptor antagonist, showing similar rapid-acting antidepressant effects to ketamine in clinical trials but with little or no psychotomimetic side effects. However, lanicemine did not meet study endpoints, and its development was terminated by AstraZeneca in 2013.

See also 
 4-Chlorokynurenine
 AD-1211
 Apimostinel
 CERC-301
 Diphenidine
 Ephenidine
 Esketamine
 Lefetamine
 Memantine
 Methoxphenidine
 MT-45
 Rapastinel

References 

Abandoned drugs
Diarylethylamines
NMDA receptor antagonists
2-Pyridyl compounds